Tandem, or in tandem, is an arrangement in which a team of machines, animals or people are lined up one behind another, all facing in the same direction.

The original use of the term in English was in tandem harness, which is used for two or more draft horses, or other draft animals, harnessed in a single line one behind another, as opposed to a pair, harnessed side by side, or a team of several pairs.  The tandem harness allows additional animals to provide pulling power for a vehicle designed for a single animal.

The English word tandem derives from the Latin adverb , meaning at length or finally. It is a word play, using the Latin phrase (referring to time, not position) for English "at length, lengthwise".

Tandem bicycles are named for their tandem seating, a more common arrangement than side-by-side "sociable" seating.  Tandem can also be used more generally to refer to any group of persons or objects working together, not necessarily in line.

Automobiles

The Messerschmitt KR200 was an example of a very small automobile that used tandem seating. A tandem arrangement may also be used for cars parked in a residential garage.

Trucks
In heavy trucks tandem refers to two closely spaced axles. Either or both axles may be powered, and often interact with each other. In the United States, both axles are typically powered and equalized; in the European Union, one axle is typically unpowered, and can often be adjusted to load, and even raised off the ground, turning a tandem into a single-axle.

Aviation 

The two seating configurations for trainer, night and all-weather interceptor or attack aircraft are pilot and instructor side by side or in tandem. Usually, the pilot is in front and the instructor behind. In attack helicopters, sometimes the pilot sits in back with the weapons operator in front for better view to aim weapons, as the Bell AH-1 Cobra was a tandem cockpit redesign which produced a much slimmer profile than the Bell UH-1 Iroquois on which it was based. Attack aircraft and all-weather interceptors often use a second crew member to operate avionics such as radar, or as a second pilot. Bombers such as the Convair B-58 Hustler seated three crew members in tandem. A common engineering adaptation is to lengthen the cockpit or fuselage to create a trainer with tandem seating from a single-seater aircraft.

Side-by-side seating 

An alternative configuration is side-by-side seating, which is common in civil aircraft of all sizes, trainers and large military aircraft, but less so in high performance jets and gliders where drag reduction is paramount. The Boeing B-47 Stratojet and Boeing XB-52 bombers used fighter-style tandem seating, but the final B-52 bomber series used a conventional side-by-side cockpit. The Grumman A-6 Intruder, General Dynamics F-111 Aardvark, Sukhoi Su-24 or the Sukhoi Su-34 are examples of combat aircraft that use this configuration. For training aircraft, it has the advantage that pilot and instructor can see each other's actions, allowing the pilot to learn from the instructor and the instructor to correct the student pilot. The tandem configuration has the advantage of being closer to the normal working environment that a fast jet pilot is likely to encounter.

In some cases, such as the Northrop Grumman EA-6B Prowler, a two-place aircraft can be lengthened into a four-place aircraft. Also, a single seat cockpit can be redesigned into a side-by-side arrangement in the case of the Douglas A-1 Skyraider, TF-102 trainer or the Hawker Hunter training versions.

Animals
During mating among odonata (dragonflies and damselflies), a male uses claspers at the end of his abdomen to grab a female between the head and thorax, forming a tandem. The pair may take flight while in tandem.

References

External links

 Clipart.com Closeup | Royalty-Free Image of tandem carriage horses harness coach driver whip Illustration. 
 Three Men In a Carriage Drawn by a Tandem Horse Team. Tandem Horse Teams Museum Victoria (Australia) official site; illustration.

Carriages
Horse driving
Animal-powered vehicles
Real object ordering
Seating